Candy is an Indian crime fiction streaming television series written by Agrim Joshi and Debojit Das Purkayastha, and directed by Ashish R. Shukla. It stars Ronit Roy, Richa Chadha, Gopal Datt, Manu Rishi Chadha and Riddhi Kumar in lead roles. The series was released on Voot on 8 September 2021.

Cast 
Cast credited from sources includes:
 Ronit Roy as Jayant Parekh
 Richa Chadha as DSP Ratna Sankhwar
 Gopal Datt as Headmaster Thomas
 Manu Rishi Chadha as Money Ranaut
 Riddhi Kumar as Kalki Rawat
 Mihir Ahuja as Mehul Awasthi
 Mikhael Kantroo as Luka
 Nakul Roshan Sahdev as Vayu Ranaut
 Sonal Panvar as Binny Parekh
 Ayesha Kaduskar as Sahiba Joshi
 Durgesh Kumar as Lambodhar Bisht
 Raj Sharma as Atmanath
 Vijayant Kohli as Father Markus
 Akash Mahamana as SI Shyam Pandey
 Aditya Nanda as Sanjay Sonowal
 Anju Alva Naik as Sonalika Parekh
 Abbas Ali Ghaznavi as John Dhakar
 Bodhisattva Sharma as Imran Ahmed
 Pawan Kumar Singh as Naresh Rawat
 Shivangi Singh as Lina Nagalia
 Prasanna Bisht as Ritika Sahay

Plot 
The series is about mysteries and secrets of Rudrakund where a student Mehul was killed and Jayant Parekh (Ronit Roy) sees that school students are addicted to drugged Candy made in Ranaut's factory. Parekh get involved into investigation with DSP Ratna Sankhwar (Richa Chadha).

Episodes

Reception 
The Indian Express wrote "Candy is a pulpy murder mystery that has the potential to create an engaging storyline but the over-the-top drama that's at play here might put off some audience members." Hindustan Times wrote "Candy holds up terrifically well with its masterful cinematics and brilliant acting by its accomplished cast. With his sharp faced intensity, Roy is convincing in the role of school teacher Jayant Parekh while actor Richa Chadda delivers yet another enthralling performance as DSP Ratna as she tries to solve the murder mysteries." The Times of India rated 3 out of 5 stars and wrote "Candy has some good performances and unpredictable twists. Nakul Roshan Sahdev as Vayu Ranaut in particular deserves a mention for his portrayal of a troubled son craving for love. The hills have eyes and creators Debojit Das Purkayastha and Agrim Joshi craft the thriller well."

Scroll.in praised Ronit Roy and Richa Chadha's acting and wrote "Ronit Roy and Richa Chadha turn out committed performances, but fare better in the rare sombre scenes in which they are permitted to have a moment to themselves." News18 wrote "Candy is an engaging thriller from start to finish, with twists you cannot predict. There is a very cool Gone Girl style shift in narration, where we find out that everything that we have known so far has been a lie. However, since they have a solid climax in place, there was no need for so many twists in the first place." Zee News rated 3.5/5 stars and wrote "Candy isn’t a PSA for drugs but a story of a corrupt system that was exposed after the death of a young life."

Pinkvilla wrote "Candy is a well-made murder mystery that rides on the towering performances of Ronit Roy and Richa Chadha with an element of unpredictability towards the end." Lehren wrote "Spread over eight episodes are a Thai connection, grave lines from Jayant Parekh on Sermons vs Science, a crude fallout between the Ranauts with father and son hurling filthy abuse at each other, and a few more killings with “Sirji” orchestrating it."

References

External links 

Indian web series
Hindi-language web series
2021 web series debuts